Nina Marie Laughlin (born December 8, 1991) is an American professional racing cyclist who rode for Visit Dallas DNA Pro Cycling in 2015 and 2016.

See also
 List of 2016 UCI Women's Teams and riders

References

External links
 

1991 births
Living people
American female cyclists
Place of birth missing (living people)
21st-century American women